Winslow Ashby (born 13 May 1953) is a Barbadian cricketer. He played in eleven first-class matches for the Barbados cricket team from 1970 to 1975.

See also
 List of Barbadian representative cricketers

References

External links
 

1953 births
Living people
Barbadian cricketers
Barbados cricketers
People from Saint Michael, Barbados